The Girl from Abroad (German: Das Mädchen aus der Fremde) is a 1927 German silent film directed by Franz Eckstein and starring Carl Auen, Frida Richard and Albert Steinrück. It attracted little attention in the press, and soon disappeared from cinemas.

The film's sets were designed by the art director Jacek Rotmil.

Cast
 Carl Auen
 Frida Richard
 Albert Steinrück
 Hermann Picha
 Lydia Potechina
 Nikolai Malikoff
 Carl Drews
 Robert Garrison
 Georges Blanvalet
 Ada Ruffo
 Sylvia Torf

References

Bibliography
 Murray, Bruce Arthur. Film and the German Left in the Weimar Republic: From Caligari to Kuhle Wampe. University of Texas Press, 1990.

External links

1927 films
Films of the Weimar Republic
German silent feature films
German black-and-white films
Films directed by Franz Eckstein